Rhodoferax ferrireducens is a psychrotolerant bacterium from the genus  Rhodoferax,  which was isolated from the mud of Oyster Bay in Virginia.

It has been found to be capable of producing electricity as it feeds on sugars, as a component in a bacterial battery.

References

External links
Type strain of Rhodoferax ferrireducens at BacDive -  the Bacterial Diversity Metadatabase

Comamonadaceae
Bacteria described in 2003